East Main Street Historic District is a national historic district located at Richfield Springs in Otsego County, New York.  It encompasses 57 contributing buildings, one contributing site, eight contributing structures, and one contributing object. The body of the district includes 33 historic residences, two historic boarding houses, a theatre, post office, a former hotel, and a church.  Spring Park includes a contributing post clock (1918), set of semi-circular limestone steps (c. 1875), bandstand (1904), and cobblestone fountain (1931).  Located within the district boundaries is the U.S. Post Office building.

It was listed on the National Register of Historic Places in 1997.

Gallery

References

Historic districts on the National Register of Historic Places in New York (state)
Houses on the National Register of Historic Places in New York (state)
Georgian architecture in New York (state)
Historic districts in Otsego County, New York
National Register of Historic Places in Otsego County, New York